In mathematics, specifically in differential topology, Morse theory enables one to analyze the topology of a manifold by studying differentiable functions on that manifold. According to the basic insights of Marston Morse, a typical differentiable function on a manifold will reflect the topology quite directly. Morse theory allows one to find CW structures and handle decompositions on manifolds and to obtain substantial information about their homology.

Before Morse, Arthur Cayley and James Clerk Maxwell had developed some of the ideas of Morse theory in the context of topography. Morse originally applied his theory to geodesics (critical points of the energy functional on the space of paths). These techniques were used in Raoul Bott's proof of his periodicity theorem.

The analogue of Morse theory for complex manifolds is Picard–Lefschetz theory.

Basic concepts

To illustrate, consider a mountainous landscape surface  (more generally, a manifold). Each connected component of a contour line is either a point, a simple closed curve, or a closed curve with a double point. Contour lines may also have points of higher order (triple points, etc.), but these are unstable and may be removed by a slight deformation of the landscape. Double points in contour lines occur at saddle points, or passes, where the surrounding landscape curves up in one direction and down in the other.

Imagine flooding this landscape with water. Consider how the topology of this surface changes as the water rises. In other words, the topology of  does not change except when the water either (1) starts filling a basin, (2) covers a saddle (a mountain pass), or (3) submerges a peak.

To these three types of critical pointsbasins, passes, and peaks (i.e. minima, saddles, and maxima)one associates a number called the index, the number of independent directions in which  decreases from the point.

Considering a more general surface, let  be a torus oriented as in the picture, with  again taking a point to its height above the plane. One can again analyze how the topology of the underwater surface  changes as the water level  rises.

Starting from the bottom of the torus, let  and  be the four critical points of index  and  corresponding to the basin, two saddles, and peak, respectively. When  is less than  then  is the empty set. After  passes the level of  when  then  is a disk, which is homotopy equivalent to a point (a 0-cell) which has been "attached" to the empty set.

This does not address what happens when two critical points are at the same height, which can be resolved by a slight perturbation of  In the case of a landscape or a manifold embedded in Euclidean space, this perturbation might simply be tilting slightly, rotating the coordinate system.

One must take care to make the critical points non-degenerate. To see what can pose a problem, let  and let  Then  is a critical point of  but the topology of  does not change when  passes  The problem is that the second derivative is that is, the Hessian of  vanishes and the critical point is degenerate.

Formal development

For the functions

A less trivial example of a degenerate critical point is the origin of the monkey saddle.

This corresponds to the intuitive notion that the index is the number of directions in which  decreases. The degeneracy and index of a critical point are independent of the choice of the local coordinate system used, as shown by Sylvester's Law.

Morse lemma
Let  be a non-degenerate critical point of   Then there exists a chart  in a neighborhood  of  such that  for all  and

As a corollary of the Morse lemma, one sees that non-degenerate critical points are isolated. (Regarding an extension to the complex domain see Complex Morse Lemma. For a generalization, see Morse–Palais lemma).

Fundamental theorems 
A smooth real-valued function on a manifold  is a Morse function if it has no degenerate critical points.  A basic result of Morse theory says that almost all functions are Morse functions.  Technically, the Morse functions form an open, dense subset of all smooth functions  in the  topology.  This is sometimes expressed as "a typical function is Morse" or "a generic function is Morse".

As indicated before, we are interested in the question of when the topology of  changes as  varies.  Half of the answer to this question is given by the following theorem.

Theorem.

It is also of interest to know how the topology of  changes when  passes a critical point.  The following theorem answers that question.

Theorem.

These results generalize and formalize the 'rule' stated in the previous section.

Using the two previous results and the fact that there exists a Morse function on any differentiable manifold, one can prove that any differentiable manifold is a CW complex with an -cell for each critical point of index   To do this, one needs the technical fact that one can arrange to have a single critical point on each critical level, which is usually proven by using gradient-like vector fields to rearrange the critical points.

Morse inequalities
Morse theory can be used to prove some strong results on the homology of manifolds.

where  is the number of critical points of index  Also by cellular homology, the rank of the th homology group of a CW complex  is less than or equal to the number of -cells in  Therefore, the rank of the th homology group, that is, the Betti number , is less than or equal to the number of critical points of index  of a Morse function on  These facts can be strengthened to obtain the :

In particular, for any

one has

This gives a powerful tool to study manifold topology. Suppose on a closed manifold there exists a Morse function  with precisely k critical points. In what way does the existence of the function  restrict ? The case  was studied by Georges Reeb in 1952; the Reeb sphere theorem states that  is homeomorphic to a sphere  The case  is possible only in a small number of low dimensions, and M is homeomorphic to an Eells–Kuiper manifold.
In 1982 Edward Witten developed an analytic approach to the Morse inequalities by considering the de Rham complex for the perturbed operator

Application to classification of closed 2-manifolds
Morse theory has been used to classify closed 2-manifolds up to diffeomorphism. If  is oriented, then  is classified by its genus  and is diffeomorphic to a sphere with  handles: thus if   is diffeomorphic to the 2-sphere; and if   is diffeomorphic to the connected sum of  2-tori. If  is unorientable, it is classified by a number  and is diffeomorphic to the connected sum of  real projective spaces  In particular two closed 2-manifolds are homeomorphic if and only if they are diffeomorphic.

Morse homology
Morse homology is a particularly easy way to understand the homology of smooth manifolds. It is defined using a generic choice of Morse function and Riemannian metric.  The basic theorem is that the resulting homology is an invariant of the manifold (that is,, independent of the function and metric) and isomorphic to the singular homology of the manifold; this implies that the Morse and singular Betti numbers agree and gives an immediate proof of the Morse inequalities.  An infinite dimensional analog of Morse homology in symplectic geometry is known as Floer homology.

Morse–Bott theory
The notion of a Morse function can be generalized to consider functions that have nondegenerate manifolds of critical points. A  is a smooth function on a manifold whose critical set is a closed submanifold and whose Hessian is non-degenerate in the normal direction. (Equivalently, the kernel of the Hessian at a critical point equals the tangent space to the critical submanifold.) A Morse function is the special case where the critical manifolds are zero-dimensional (so the Hessian at critical points is non-degenerate in every direction, that is, has no kernel).

The index is most naturally thought of as a pair

Morse–Bott functions are useful because generic Morse functions are difficult to work with; the functions one can visualize, and with which one can easily calculate, typically have symmetries. They often lead to positive-dimensional critical manifolds. Raoul Bott used Morse–Bott theory in his original proof of the Bott periodicity theorem.

Round functions are examples of Morse–Bott functions, where the critical sets are (disjoint unions of) circles.

Morse homology can also be formulated for Morse–Bott functions; the differential in Morse–Bott homology is computed by a spectral sequence.  Frederic Bourgeois sketched an approach in the course of his work on a Morse–Bott version of symplectic field theory, but this work was never published due to substantial analytic difficulties.

See also

References

Further reading 

 
 
 
  
 
  
  
 
 
  A classic advanced reference in mathematics and mathematical physics.
 
 
 

 
Lemmas
Smooth functions